Callorhinchus callorynchus, the American elephantfish or cockfish, is a species of fish in the family Callorhinchidae found in southern Brazil, Peru, Chile, Argentina, and Uruguay. Its natural habitat is open seas.

Being a holocephalan from the southwestern region of the Atlantic, C. callorynchus is a vital resource for fisheries in Argentina. A study was conducted on the reproductive biology of the cockfish by Melisa A. Chierichetti from UNMDP, which found that there was a presence of sexual dimorphism, where the females were larger and heavier than the males of that population. Another aspect of this study had discovered that the relative fecundity rate of the C. callorynchus population was significantly low because the females were in the resting stage of their reproductive cycle. Also, the males in the population weren't mature, thus the population was found to not be highly reproductive. This information was expected to be helpful in implementing methods for conservation and reduced over-fishing.

References

External links
 Callorhinchus callorynchus at FishBase

Callorhinchus
Fish described in 1758
Taxa named by Carl Linnaeus